Eling is a hamlet in the civil parish of Hampstead Norreys in the English county of Berkshire. The Eling estate was owned by Gerald Palmer and is now administered by a charitable trust.

References

External links

Hamlets in Berkshire
West Berkshire District